Travesuras de la niña mala is a Mexican streaming television series based on the novel of the same name, written by Mario Vargas Llosa. The series produced by W Studios for TelevisaUnivision. It stars Macarena Achaga and Juan Pablo Di Pace.

The series premiered on Vix+ on 8 December 2022.

Cast 
 Macarena Achaga as Arlette
 Juan Pablo Di Pace as Ricardo Somocurcio
 Jaime Maqueo as Young Ricardo
 Rowi Prieto as Paul
 Vanessa Saba as Tía Alberta
 Mariana Flores as Ana
 Natalia Benvenuto as Tía Adriana
 Paulina Gil as Lily
 Mónica Guzmán as Eufrasia
 Fernando Soto as Charnés
 Martijn Kuiper as Mr. Richardson
 Alba Messa as Carmencita
 Elisabeth Marín as Pilar
 Raúl Vega Damian as Alfredo
 Adriana Butoi as Marguerite
 Eduardo Tanús as Mateo
 Nestor Rodulfo as Chacón
 Fernando Cayo as Robert
 Edgardo González as Torrijos
 Juan Carlos Rey de Castro as Alberto
 Alec Chaparro as Henry
 Axel de la Rosa as Muñoz
 Olfa Masmoudi as Cecile
 Nacho Tapia as Lorenzo
 Katixa Mecerreyes as Sara
 Luiggi Lomparte as José
 Natalia Payán as Marirosa
 Lot Soffi as Young Marirosa
 Nidia Bermejo as Inge
 María Gutiérrez as Young Inge
 Carlos Humberto as Luquen
 Santiago Elizondo as Young Luquen
 Teo Izquierdo as Pierre
 Javier Dulzaldes as Juan Barreto
 Inge Ladd as Mrs. Stubard
 Lariza Juárez as Pamela
 Julián Segura as Roy
 Mauro Sánchez Navarro as Manu
 Laura Valen as René
 Elena Pérez as Elisa
 Steph Bumelcrownd as Lucy
 Renata Chacón as Young Lucy
 Victor Civeira as Salomón

Production

Development 
In June 2021, the series was announced as one of the titles for TelevisaUnivision's streaming platform Vix+. Filming began on 13 July 2022. In October 2022, the series was presented at the 2022 MIPCOM trade fair, where the series trailer was unveiled. On 17 November 2022, it was announced that the series will premiere on 17 November 2022.

Casting 
On 23 June 2022, Macarena Achaga was cast in the lead role. On 13 July 2022, Juan Pablo Di Pace was cast in a main role. On 17 October 2022, an extensive cast list was published by online news site Deadline Hollywood.

Episodes

References

External links 
 

2020s Mexican television series
2022 Mexican television series debuts
Vix (streaming service) original programming
Television series by Televisa
Television series produced by W Studios
Spanish-language television shows
Mexican drama television series